Jeff Richards (born January 3, 1991) is a gridiron football defensive back who is a free agent. He was most recently a member of the Edmonton Elks of the Canadian Football League (CFL). He played college football at Northeastern Oklahoma A&M from 2009 to 2010 before transferring to Emporia State. He previously played for the Ottawa Redblacks and helped them win the 104th Grey Cup in 2016.

Professional career
On December 17, 2013, Richards attended a tryout with the New York Jets, but was not signed.

Spokane Shock
In 2015, Richards played five games for the Spokane Shock of the Arena Football League and recorded 25 combined tackles, eight pass deflections, and a forced fumble.

Ottawa Redblacks
Richards played for the Ottawa Redblacks of the CFL from 2015 to 2016. In his first season, he recorded four combined tackles in three games. He finished the 2016 season with 18 combined tackles in ten games. Richards helped the Redblacks win the 104th Grey Cup after defeating the Calgary Stampeders 39–33.

Carolina Panthers
On January 4, 2017, the Carolina Panthers signed Richards to a reserve/future contract. On September 2, 2017, Richards was waived by the Panthers as part of their final roster cuts.

Los Angeles Chargers
On September 3, 2017, Richards was claimed off waivers by the Los Angeles Chargers. He was waived by the Chargers on September 11, 2017, and was re-signed to the practice squad two days later. He signed a reserve/future contract with the Chargers on January 2, 2018.

On September 1, 2018, Richards was waived by the Chargers.

Tampa Bay Buccaneers
On September 11, 2018, Richards was signed to the Tampa Bay Buccaneers' practice squad. He was released on September 25, 2018.

Los Angeles Chargers (second stint)
On October 10, 2018, Richards was signed to the Los Angeles Chargers practice squad. He was promoted to the active roster on November 3, 2018. He was waived on August 31, 2019.

Toronto Argonauts
Richards signed with the Toronto Argonauts on January 13, 2020. The Canadian Football League cancelled the 2020 season and Richards was released on August 17, 2020. He was re-signed by the Argonauts for the 2021 CFL season on January 18, 2021. He played and started in 13 regular season games where he had 42 defensive tackles and one interception. He was released on April 29, 2022.

Edmonton Elks
Richards signed with the Edmonton Elks on September 3, 2022. He was later released on December 1, 2022.

References

External links
Toronto Argonauts bio

1991 births
Living people
American football cornerbacks
Canadian football defensive backs
Carolina Panthers players
Emporia State Hornets football players
Los Angeles Chargers players
Ottawa Redblacks players
People from Del City, Oklahoma
Players of American football from Oklahoma
Spokane Shock players
Sportspeople from Oklahoma County, Oklahoma
Tampa Bay Buccaneers players
Toronto Argonauts players